Indravarman II (Sanskrit: जय इंद्रवर्मन; ? - 893) was the king of Champa from 854 to 893 and the founder of Champa's Sixth dynasty.

Reign
During his reign, relations between Champa and China was restored. Chinese historians begin referring Champa by Chang-cheng or the city of Cham in its Sanskrit form. He founded a new capital, Indrapura in modern-day Quang Nam Province.

Indravarman claimed himself to be a master that had been enlightened after many years of meditating, not a member of any noble house or previous dynasties.

He authorized the construction of Lakshmindralokeçvara temple, a Mahayana Buddhist monastery located in Dong Duong (Indrapura), southeast of Mỹ Sơn. A royal cult consecrating to Avalokiteśvara was highly promoted by the Cham elites. In 889, Khmer ruler Yasovarman I led an invasion of Champa, but was repelled by Indravarman II.

References

Bibliography
 
  

Kings of Champa
9th-century Vietnamese people
893 deaths
9th-century monarchs in Asia